"Free in the Knowledge" is the fifth single released by the English rock band the Smile from their debut studio album, A Light for Attracting Attention. It was released on April 20, 2022 by XL Recordings. The track was first played live by Thom Yorke on October 2021 at the Royal Albert Hall. The song ws also played on December 2, 2021 on a live instagram post featuring the band rehearsing new tracks with one of these being "Free in the Knowledge".

Music Video 
The music video was directed by Leo Leigh and features a group of people in a forest, the first half shows them the group of people in extreme distress and anguish until around the half-way point, when small clips of exposition play showing glimpses other people and a form of ritualistic ceremony. The video has been described as unsettling & haunting among other things.

Reception 
Writing for Consequence, Alex Lake enjoyed the track describing as a "extremely successful attempt at evoking a misty-eyed thousand-yard stare" and praises the backing band calling them "extremely overqualified". Nathaniel Fitzgerald of Tuned Up also enjoyed the track noting how the track takes a break from the "hyperactive jazz drums and angular guitar in favor of a delicate acoustic, electric piano, and wash of strings", as the track doesn't have any percussion until the 3 minute mark. He also describes the track as a line between hopeless and romantic. Writing for Beatsperminute.com, Rob H. described the track as an "acoustic dreamer" that features Thom Yorke reflecting on "horrors experienced in modern life". noting the slow buildup of strings and horns from the London Contemporary Orchestra. The lyrics on the track as Thom reflecting on a changed world by multiple critics.

Track listing 
The song, on specific streaming services and digital storefronts, also contains the four previously released singles from the band:

Personnel 
Credits adapted from album liner notes.

The Smile

 Thom Yorke – vocals, synthesizer, acoustic guitar
 Jonny Greenwood – piano, bass
 Tom Skinner – drums

Production

 Nigel Godrich

Additional musicians
 London Contemporary Orchestra
 Hugh Brunt – orchestration
 Eloisa-Fleur Thom – violin
 Alessandro Ruisi – violin
 Zara Benyounes – violin
 Sophie Mather – violin
 Agata Daraskaite – violin
 Charlotte Bonneton – violin
 Zoe Matthews – viola
 Clifton Harrison – viola
 Oliver Coates – cello
 Max Ruisi – cello
 Clare O’Connell – cello
 Jason Yarde – saxophone
 Robert Stillman – saxophone
 Chelsea Carmichael – flute
 Nathaniel Cross – trombone
 Byron Wallen – trumpet
 Theon Cross – tuba
 Tom Herbert – double bass
 Dave Brown – double bass

References 

2022 songs
2022 singles
Songs written by Jonny Greenwood
Songs written by Thom Yorke
Song recordings produced by Nigel Godrich
The Smile songs